Phoenicolacerta troodica is a species of lizard in the family Lacertidae. It is endemic to Cyprus, where it is common and widespread.

Habitat and conservation
Its natural habitats are Mediterranean-type shrubby vegetation, rocky areas, rural areas and possibly more urban ones. Its population is stable.

Description
Its length is up to 22cm, with males slightly larger than females. Tail length is between 2–2.3 times body length.

References

troodica
Reptiles of Europe
Endemic fauna of Cyprus
Reptiles described in 1936
Taxa named by Franz Werner